Thomas "Tom" Secunda (born 1954) is an American billionaire businessman, best known as one of the four co-founders of Bloomberg L.P. and its vice chairman. As of May 2022, his net worth was estimated at US$4.1 billion. He has signed Giving Pledge which commits him to donating the majority of his wealth to charity.

Early life
Thomas Secunda was born in 1954 in Bethpage, New York. He graduated from Binghamton University with bachelor's and master's degrees in mathematics.

Career
Beginning his career as a programmer, Thomas Secunda worked as a fixed-income trader at Morgan Stanley, as well as a systems researcher at Salomon Brothers, where he worked alongside future co-founder of Bloomberg L.P. and Mayor of New York City Michael Bloomberg.

In 1982, Secunda joined his former Salomon Brothers colleagues Michael Bloomberg, Duncan MacMillan, and Charles Zegar to set up Innovative Market Systems, later renamed Bloomberg L.P. in 1987. He serves as the global head of Bloomberg’s Financial Products and Services where his primary responsibility is to help Bloomberg develop new features and tools for the Bloomberg Professional service, the company’s primary product, driving 85 percent of its estimated $7 billion in revenue. As head of Financial Products, Secunda oversees a global staff of 6,000. In July 2011, Secunda was appointed vice chairman of Bloomberg L.P.

In addition to being one of the four co-founders of Bloomberg L.P., Secunda sits on the board of directors.  When asked about Bloomberg, Secunda has said, "I'm immensely proud of the culture, the people and the company. The product is wonderful and I'm very proud of that as well."

Philanthropy
Secunda and his wife Cindy are signatories of the Giving Pledge. The beneficiaries of the couple's charitable giving are primarily organizations that focus on "National Parks, local parks, conservation, healthcare and Jewish causes." Since devastating 2017 hurricane impacted the U.S. Virgin Islands and other parts of the Caribbean, Secunda has been deeply involved in reconstruction efforts there. In 2011, Secunda was appointed chairman of the National Parks Conservation Association. He is on the board of trustees for the Intrepid Museum Foundation, and the board of directors of the Manhattan Theater Club. In 2012, he was awarded the Simon Wiesenthal Center's award for his philanthropic work.

Personal life
Secunda lives with his wife, Cynthia "Cindy" Cohen, who is also Jewish, and their two daughters in Croton-on-Hudson, New York.

References

1954 births
American billionaires
Bloomberg L.P. founders
American corporate directors
Binghamton University alumni
Giving Pledgers
21st-century philanthropists
Living people
20th-century American Jews
People from Bethpage, New York
People from Croton-on-Hudson, New York
21st-century American Jews